Edward Trelawny (1699 – 16 January 1754) was a British colonial administrator and military officer who served as the governor of Jamaica from April 1738 to September 1752. He is best known for his role in signing a treaty with ended the First Maroon War between the British colonial government in Jamaica and the Jamaican Maroons.

Early life
Edward Trelawny was born in 1699 in Trelawne, Cornwall, England. Of an ancient and well-known Cornish family, he was a younger son of Bishop Sir Jonathan Trelawny and brother of Sir John Trelawny.

In 1734, Trelawny incorporated himself to the British Army to participate in the war of the Polish Succession, which faced the Polish troops and allied against French troops. After this, Trelawny joined to both East Looe and West Looe.

So, he returned to Parliament in this year (1734), but both elections were declared void, as he was then a commissioner of customs in Scotland and ineligible to sit in Parliament.

Governor of Jamaica

He was appointed governor of Jamaica in April 1738, at a time when the colonial authorities on the island were in the midst of waging a conflict against the Jamaican Maroons. Quickly realizing that the colonial authorities could not win a conflict against a group of runaway slaves who were waging a successful guerrilla campaign, in March of the following year, Trelawny offered the Maroons of Cudjoe's Town (Trelawny Town) a peace agreement.

Once Cudjoe signed this treaty, Trelawny offered a similar treaty to the Windward Maroons in 1740. This overture was supported by the British colonists in the island, and the treaty officially recognized and accepted the freedom of the Maroons, and allocated them land. This treaty ended the First Maroon War, which had encompassed the 1730s, and saw the colonial militia fighting on two fronts, against the Leeward Maroons in western Jamaica, and the Windward Maroons in the eastern end of the island. 

Trelawny left office in September 1752. Cudjoe's Town was renamed Trelawny Town in his honour. He also fought in the War of Jenkins' Ear (the American phase of the War of the Austrian Succession, 1740–1748), which pitted Great Britain against Spain.

Later life and death

In 1747, Trelawny wrote and published a pamphlet titled An Essay concerning Slavery, in which he expounded his abolitionist sentiments, arguing that slavery in Jamaica should be abolished. The pamphlet immediately proved controversial among the Jamaican slavocracy, whom Trelawny felt owned too many slaves. However, Trelawny was aware that the Jamaican economy was founded almost entirely upon a slave-based system, which operated the numerous and lucrative sugar plantations located on the island. Thus, Trelawny stipulated in the pamphlet that he was ultimately content with the slave trade to the island being abolished, which would in his view lead to the eventual abolition of slavery in Jamaica.

While serving as governor, Trelawny married a wealthy widow who had inherited between £30,000 and £40,000 "in Jamaican money". However, shortly after marrying her, Trelawny requested that he be replaced due to having contracted a heart disease. On November 1752, Trelawny returned to England, receiving praise from the Jamaican House of Assembly for conducting a "just administration" and the "many important services" he had made during his tenure as governor. Trelawny died on 16 January 1754 in London at the age of 55.

References 

1699 births
1754 deaths
49th Regiment of Foot officers
British MPs 1722–1727
British MPs 1727–1734
Governors of Jamaica
Members of the Parliament of Great Britain for English constituencies
Younger sons of baronets